The Brechfa television relay station is sited on high ground to the east of the village of Brechfa to the northeast of Carmarthen. It was originally built in the 1980s as a fill-in relay for UHF analogue colour television covering the communities of Brechfa, Horeb and Aber Goleu. It consists of a 12 m self-supporting lattice steel mast standing on a hillside which is itself about 290 m above sea level. The transmissions are beamed northeast to cover all these targets. The Brechfa transmission station is owned and operated by Arqiva.

Brechfa transmitter re-radiates the signal received off-air from Carmel about 30 km to the south. When it came, the digital switchover process for Brechfa duplicated the timing at Carmel with the first stage taking place on 26 August 2009 and with the second stage being completed on 23 September 2009. After the switchover process, analogue channels had ceased broadcasting permanently and the Freeview digital TV services were radiated at an ERP of 3.6 W each.

Channels listed by frequency

Analogue television

1980s - 26 August 2009
Brechfa (being in Wales) transmitted the S4C variant of Channel 4.

Analogue and digital television

26 August 2009 - 23 September 2009
The UK's digital switchover commenced at Carmel (and therefore at Brechfa and all its other relays) on 26 August 2009. Analogue BBC Two Wales on channel 27 was first to close, replaced by the new digital BBC A mux which started up in 64-QAM and at full power (i.e. 3.6 W) on that same channel.

Digital television

23 September 2009 - present
The remaining analogue TV services were closed down and the digital multiplexes took over on the original analogue channels' frequencies.

References

External links
The Transmission Gallery: Brechfa

Transmitter sites in Wales
Carmel UHF 625-line Transmitter Group